Elina Svitolina was the defending champion, but withdrew before the tournament began.

Tímea Babos won the title, defeating Kateryna Kozlova in the final, 7–5, 6–1.

Seeds

Draw

Finals

Top half

Bottom half

Qualifying

Seeds

Qualifiers

Lucky losers

Draw

First qualifier

Second qualifier

Third qualifier

Fourth qualifier

Fifth qualifier

Sixth qualifier

References
 Main Draw
 Qualifying Draw

Taiwan Open
WTA Taiwan Open